The Dead Don't Die is a 1975 American made-for-television neo-noir horror thriller film set in the 1930s, directed by Curtis Harrington from a teleplay by Robert Bloch, based upon his own story of the same title that first appeared in Fantastic Adventures, July 1951. The film originally premiered on NBC on January 14, 1975. The film uses the traditional Haitian concept of zombies as resurrected slaves of the living.

Plot

In 1934, Don Drake returns to Chicago after a long sea voyage and discovers that his brother has been convicted of murdering his wife. Drake is unable to save him from the electric chair, but he is convinced of his brother’s innocence and is determined to clear his name. His investigation leads him to the Loveland Ballroom, the scene of the murder, where his brother was involved in a dance marathon run by Jim Moss.

Drake begins seeing his dead brother walking the foggy streets.  Drake kills a man named Perdido, who later climbs out of a coffin and attacks him. Police Lieutenant Reardon doesn’t believe Drake’s story, and Reardon later finds Perdido is alive and well. As Drake presses his investigation, he learns of a mystery man named Varrick, whom no one has ever seen and who might be using Haitian voodoo to bring people back from the dead. Varrick turns out to be Jim Moss, played by Ray Milland, the voodoo master of the zombified slaves. Cornered by Varrick and his resurrected brother, Drake shows the zombified brother the body of his wife, and reveals that Varrick had her killed by Frank Speck.

Reception
Bloch gives his opinion of the movie in his autobiography, Once Around the Bloch. "The Dead Don't Die. Maybe they don't, but the show did. Despite Curtis's casting of accomplished character actors, their supporting roles couldn't prop up the lead. And Ray Milland, who had given such a deftly paced performance in my script for Home Away from Home, merely plodded through his part here like a zombie without a deadline." ("Home Away from Home" was a short story by Bloch which he had adapted for Episode 1, Season 9 of Alfred Hitchcock Presents).

Michael Weldon writes of the film that it is: "A tribute to the poverty-row horrors of the '30s that tries hard to be as ridiculous as the originals. A group of West Indians in Chicago plots to rule the world with zombies. Involves hammy acting from George Hamilton as hero Don Drake."

Videohound's Golden Movie Retriever comments that an "unbelievable plot set in the 1930s has Hamilton as a detective trying to prove his brother was wrongly executed for murder. He ultimately clashes with the madman who wants to rule the world with an army of zombies. Perhaps if they had cast Hamilton as Master of the Zombies." Craddock, Jim (ed)  This guide awards the film only one 'bone' out of four, which equates to "poor use of camera, film, sets, script, actors and studio vehicles."

Cast list
George Hamilton as Don Drake
Linda Cristal as Vera LaValle
Joan Blondell as Levenia
Ralph Meeker as Lt. Reardon
James McEachin as Frankie Specht
Reggie Nalder as Perdido
Ray Milland as Jim Moss/Varrick
Jerry Douglas as Ralph Drake
William O'Connell as Priest
Yvette Vickers as Miss Adrian

See also
 List of American films of 1975

References

External links

Review at Notcoming.com

1975 television films
1975 films
1975 horror films
1970s thriller films
American horror thriller films
Films set in the 1930s
Films set in 1934
Films set in Chicago
Films directed by Curtis Harrington
Films scored by Robert Prince
Fiction about Haitian Vodou
NBC network original films
American horror television films
American neo-noir films
American zombie films
Films based on works by Robert Bloch
Films with screenplays by Robert Bloch
1970s American films